Rafael Czichos (born 14 May 1990) is a German professional footballer who plays as a centre-back for Major League Soccer club Chicago Fire.

Career
Born in Jeddah, Saudi Arabia while his father worked there, Czichos began his career at TSV Ottersberg and joined VfL Wolfsburg II in 2010. In 2012, he signed with then 3. Liga side Rot-Weiss Erfurt. After signing with Holstein Kiel, Czichos first played in the 2. Bundesliga when the team won promotion in 2017.

However, Kiel failed to win promotion after the 2017–18 season and he was sold to newly relegated side 1. FC Köln for a fee of €1.8 million. He made his debut, including his first goal, for the club in a 2–0 victory against VfL Bochum on 4 August 2018. Having been an undisputed starter in the first half of the 2021–22 season, he left 1. FC Köln in January 2022, with half a year left on his contract. kicker described the move as "surprising".

On 2 January 2022, Czichos transferred to Major League Soccer club Chicago Fire on a three-year contract.

Personal life
In a July 2018 interview Czichos revealed he was a life-long fan of Werder Bremen.

References

External links

1990 births
Living people
Association football central defenders
German footballers
Sportspeople from Jeddah
Citizens of Germany through descent
VfL Wolfsburg II players
FC Rot-Weiß Erfurt players
Holstein Kiel players
1. FC Köln players
Chicago Fire FC players
3. Liga players
2. Bundesliga players
Bundesliga players
German expatriate footballers
German expatriate sportspeople in the United States
Expatriate soccer players in the United States
Major League Soccer players